Batsükhiin Khayankhyarvaa (born 27 November 1958) is a Mongolian former cyclist. He competed in the individual road race and team time trial events at the 1980 Summer Olympics and 1990 Asian Games.

References

External links
 

1958 births
Living people
Mongolian male cyclists
Olympic cyclists of Mongolia
Cyclists at the 1980 Summer Olympics
Place of birth missing (living people)
Asian Games medalists in cycling
Cyclists at the 1990 Asian Games
Asian Games silver medalists for Mongolia
Medalists at the 1990 Asian Games
Cyclists at the 1994 Asian Games
20th-century Mongolian people